NGC 4088 is an intermediate spiral galaxy in the constellation Ursa Major.  The galaxy forms a physical pair with NGC 4085, which is located 11′ away.

General information 

NGC 4088 is a grand design spiral galaxy.  This means that the spiral arms in the galaxy's disk are sharply defined.  In visible light, one of the spiral arms appears to have a disconnected segment. Halton Arp included this galaxy in the Atlas of Peculiar Galaxies as one of several examples where this phenomenon occurs.

NGC 4088 and NGC 4085 are members of the M109 Group, a group of galaxies located in the constellation Ursa Major.  This large group contains between 41 and 58 galaxies, including the spiral galaxy M109.

Supernova 2009dd
On April 13, 2009, supernova SN 2009dd was discovered in NGC 4088. At apparent magnitude 13.8, it became the third-brightest supernova of 2009.  In 1991 there was SN1991G.

References

External links

 Light curves and spectra of SN2009dd  on the Open Supernova Catalog
 

Intermediate spiral galaxies
M109 Group
Ursa Major (constellation)
4088
07081
038302
018